Lee Kim Lai (1960 – 25 April 1978; 李金来 Lǐ Jīnlái) was a police officer who was murdered on 25 April 1978 for his service revolver by three men. A serving Police National Serviceman, he was performing sentry duty at the Police Reserve Unit 1 base of the Singapore Police Force at Mount Vernon when he was abducted from the front gate and forced into a taxi. His body was later found with multiple stab wounds in the abandoned taxi, the driver of which was also killed.

Background

Ong Chin Hock (王进福 Wáng Jìnfú), Yeo Ching Boon (杨青文 Yáng Qīngwén) and Ong Hwee Kuan (王慧君 Wáng Huìjūn), all aged 20, were childhood friends since their days in Tu Li Primary School (土里小学). The former left school in primary three, and began working three jobs: an odd job labourer, a hawker assistant and a construction worker, until his enlistment for National Service in the army. Yeo was expelled from Tu Li Secondary School when he was in Secondary Three after a fight and worked as a stock handler for three months before he was again sacked for fighting. He then worked as a fitter and a wireman before he was enlisted with the Singapore Police Force for his National Service, where he was posted to the Police Reserve Unit 1 base.

The last of the three, a school drop-out at age 12 after repeatedly failing his Entrance Examination in 1972, had worked as a painter and an odd job labourer. He has been involved in petty crimes with other members of the "18 group" of Sio Kun Tong, a secret society. He was placed under police supervision for a year in February 1974 for involvement with the group and was jailed for two years in 1973 for consorting with another police supervisee. He was subsequently under police supervision for another year upon his release. In 1976, he robbed a Malay man for his watch and cash with Chin Hock and another friend. In April 1977, he was detained in the Telok Pakau Drug Rebabilitation Centre for six months for smoking heroin.

The second-oldest child in a family of five siblings, Lee Kim Lai, aged 18, was attached to the Police Reserve Unit 1 at Mount Vernon for his National Service.

The plot
The plot to commit robbery was first proposed by Ong Hwee Kuan on the night of 21 April 1978 when the three friends were gathered at a playground in Geylang Bahru, as a solution to the economic hardship that the three were experiencing. Because the other two did not protest, Hwee Kuan went on to suggest that a gun would be needed for such an act, although firearms were outlawed in Singapore. Ching Boon recalled his days serving as a police sentry at the PRU base and proposed stealing the gun from the sentry posted there. They could not come up with a feasible idea to commit the crime without attracting attention, however. The following day when the three met again, Ching Boon suggested approaching the sentry while dressed in his police uniform, with Chin Hock in his military attire and to threaten the sentry with icepicks. Chin Hock, however, felt the uniforms would only attract the attention of the camp guard, but none could think of a way to commit the act without anyone noticing. Ching Boon felt that the risk was worth taking using his plan and proposed to carry it out at 2:00 am on 25 April when the sentries are likely to be less alert.

On 24 April, they proceeded to pawn Chin Hock's watch in exchange for cash to buy two kitchen knives at about 9:00 pm, which Hwee Kuan felt was necessary to threaten the policemen. Ching Boon, particularly wary that they may be searched by patrolling policemen, brought the knives home, where he packed them together with four yellow nylon ropes, an icepick and a pair of gloves in a traveling bag belonging to his brother. At 11:45 pm, they met for a final meal at Kallang Bahru, where Ching Boon proposed an alternative plan to steal a taxi. The taxi driver would be tied up with the nylon rope and the taxi would be driven to the PRU base by Chin Hock. Hwee Kuan would pretend to be drunk in the backseat while Ching Boon would approach the sentry for help and lure him to the taxi, whereupon they would seize the policeman, drive the taxi to a secluded spot and rob him of his service revolver. Hwee Kuan expressed concern that he may be recognised after the act by the abducted policeman or the taxi driver as he had a police record. Ching Boon suggested killing both men, to which Hwee Kuan was relieved and Chin Hock expressed no comment. They also abandoned the idea of wearing the uniforms.

The murders
At about 1:30 am on 25 April 1978, the three men left the coffee shop and Ching Boon went home to change and collect the traveling bag. Dressed in a red T-shirt, he tucked the icepick into his dark blue pants. Chin Hock was dressed in a white long sleeved top and dark blue pants, while Hwee Kuan was in a beige long sleeve top and blue jeans. The trio waited along Kallang Bahru near Block 66 for a taxi. Soon, a Yellow Top taxi stopped for them, driven by Chew Theng Hin, aged 60. Ching Boon got into the front seat and instructed the driver to go to the PRU base. Hwee Kuan sat behind the driver, and Chin Hock behind Ching Boon. The taxi proceeded via Bendemeer Road, Whampoa East Road, Serangoon Road and Upper Aljunied Road. Chew was instructed to stop the taxi near the rear gate of the PRU base at a dark and secluded stretch of the road.

Suddenly, Hwee Kuan restrained Chew from behind and placed a knife to his neck. Ching Boon stuffed a cloth into his mouth and warned him not to make any noise while brandishing the icepick. He tied the driver with the nylon ropes and ordered him out of the taxi, when Chew suddenly attempted to break free from the aggressors. He was quickly subdued by Ching Boon and Chin Hock while Hwee Kuan stabbed Chew in the stomach. Ching Boon and Hwee Kuan pulled the driver out of the taxi and dumped him in a roadside drain as Chin Hock got into the driver's seat and prepared to move off. Just then, they spotted Chew attempting to climb out of the drain. Ching Boon and Hwee Kuan stabbed the man in the neck with the icepick and knife respectively causing Chew to fall back into the drain. When they returned to the car, Chew was spotted again trying to climb out leading to a third round of stabbings. Chin Hock drove the taxi towards the main gate of the PRU base.

In the early morning of 25 April 1978, Lee, who was on sentry duty for the first time, took over the hourly sentry duty from fellow officer Koh Kah Kway at 2:00 am. He was issued with his service revolver, a .38 Webley & Scott, and ten rounds of ammunition, five of which were already loaded in the revolver. Soon after, the Yellow Top taxi approached the gate. The front seat passenger, Ching Boon, alighted from the taxi with the icepick hidden in his waist and approached the sentry, flashing his NS Police Warrant. He lied to Lee that he and Hwee Kuan were from the PRU base and asked his help to carry Hwee Kuan from the backseat of the taxi, where he was apparently heavily drunk. Believing this to be a genuine emergency, Lee left his post and followed Ching Boon to the taxi.

Once Ching Boon opened the rear back door of the taxi, he allowed Lee to look into the taxi first, whereupon Hwee Kuan quickly grabbed the surprised policeman and pulled him into the rear seat. Ching Boon helped to push the struggling man in, slammed the door shut and quickly returned to his front seat. En route, he noticed what appeared to be figures looking at his direction from the police quarters and hurriedly asked Chin Hock to leave. As the taxi sped away along Upper Aljunied Road, Hwee Kuan stabbed the knife into Lee's neck and removed his revolver which was handed over to Ching Boon. As Hwee Kuan struggled to remove the blade from the cop's neck where it had become stuck, Ching Boon grabbed the second knife and stabbed the still struggling NSF (Full-time National Serviceman) several more times in the neck and upper body from the front seat, in the midst of which he accidentally cut Hwee Kuan's index finger. By the time Lee's body had stopped moving, his blood had spilled all over the back seat and onto Hwee Kuan's clothes.

Chin Hock was instructed to stop the taxi five minutes later at Kallang Bahru, where Ching Boon rummaged the dead policeman's uniform and retrieved all ten rounds of ammunition. Ching Boon collected the knife from Hwee Kuan and instructed him to hide in the bushes while he and Chin Hock left the scene to collect clean clothing from Ching Boon's home. They returned ten minutes later and Chin Hock dumped the bloodied clothing into a plastic bag containing clean clothing he changed into. The three proceeded to leave, before being stopped by a man, who turned out to be Constable Siew Man Seng.

Arrest and investigation
A patrol car spotted the abandoned taxi and found Lee's body with 15 cut and stab wounds in his upper body, including a fatal double stab wound in the neck. His service revolver was missing. The taxi driver, Chew Theng Hin, was also found dead with a stab wound in the abdomen.

The three men were quickly arrested with the help of Constable Siew, who happened to be at the scene and spotted two of them behaving suspiciously soon after the murders. They were subsequently convicted for the murder of Lee and Chew and hanged on 24 February 1984.

Aftermath
The murder of Lee made front-page news in relatively crime-free Singapore, and was particularly noted for the speed in which the case was solved. The case appeared in a compilation of notable crimes in a 1987 publication, 999 True Cases from the CID, and was re-enacted in a television drama, True Files in 2002.

Publication
The robbery, kidnapping and murder of Lee was considered as a notable crime that shook Singapore. In July 2015, Singapore's national daily newspaper The Straits Times published a e-book titled Guilty As Charged: 25 Crimes That Have Shaken Singapore Since 1965, which included the case as one of the top 25 crimes that shocked the nation since its independence in 1965. The book was borne out of collaboration between the Singapore Police Force and the newspaper itself.

See also
Capital punishment in Singapore
List of kidnappings
List of Singapore police officers killed in the line of duty

Notes

References
"999 True Files from the CID", Nicky Moey, Times Books International, 1987 , 

1960 births
1970s missing person cases
1978 deaths
Formerly missing people
Kidnapped people
Male murder victims
Missing person cases in Singapore
Murder in Singapore
People murdered in Singapore
Singaporean people of Chinese descent
Singaporean police officers killed in the line of duty
Singaporean people convicted of murder